Tetsuya Tsuchida (土田哲也; Tsuchida Tetsuya, born February 18, 1981, in Yokosuka, Kanagawa), better known by his stage name Tetsuya, is a Japanese dancer, actor, businessman and lecturer. He is a member of Exile and Exile The Second. He was also a member of Dance Earth Party and J Soul Brothers' second generation Nidaime J Soul Brothers until their migration to Exile in 2009.

Tetsuya is represented with LDH. He is engaged in various activities in the field of dance education and has graduated with a master's degree in sport sciences from Waseda University in 2018. Furthermore, he is the director of the "EXILE Performance Institute (EPI)", the coffee brand AMAZING COFFEE and "EXPG High School".

Early life 
Tetsuya Tsuchida was born on February 18, 1981, in Kanagawa Prefecture, Japan. He is a Yokosuka City Elementary School and Yokosuka City Shinmei Junior High School graduate. After graduating from high school, Tetsuya went on to study agriculture in high school due to the influence of his parents who are engaged in farm work. After graduating from high school, he worked at his father's company. Tetsuya was an active swimmer for 10 years from elementary school to high school and started practicing dancing at age of 19.

In 2002, Tetsuya, Tsun, and John J. O'Connor together formed the dance team poly-3. The name poly-3 was created by John deriving from the terms polyglot, polychromatic, and polyphony. Later, Kenchi Tachibana joined as a new member with other local dancers from Yokosuka. In 2004, Tetsuya appeared in Exile's stage-play HEART of GOLD ~STREET FUTURE OPERA BEAT POPS~. A year later, in 2005, he formed the dance team FULCRUM alongside Kenchi, Keiji Kuroki and others. The team lasted until 2006, when he joined the Krump team RAG POUND.

Career 
On January 25, 2007, he was selected as member of the second generation from the group J Soul Brothers and his stage name became TETSUYA. On May 7, 2008, he made his official debut in Nidaime J Soul Brothers with the single "WE!". The group announced their indefinite hiatus after releasing one album in 2009 and all members joined the line-up of Exile shortly after.

On August 4, 2009, it was announced that Tetsuya would make his acting debut in the Fuji TV drama Shin Oishinbo 3 Kaibara Yūzan vs Kyūkyoku Nana-ri no Samurai!.

In 2011, Tetsuya established the "EXILE Performance Institute (EPI)" and became the director of the company. He also designed the training system “E.P.I. Training”.

On March 30, 2012, it was announced that he would play his first leading role in the drama Kimi to Boku to no Yakusoku (君と僕との約束; Promise Between You and Me) alongside fellow Exile member Keiji Kuroki. On July 1, 2012, Tetsuya joined the Exile sub-unit Exile The Second alongside his fellow former Nidaime J Soul Brothers members Shokichi, Nesmith, Keiji and Kenchi. In August of the same year, he was appointed as a lecturer for NHK-E's program E Dance Academy together with Exile's Üsa. It would serve as an educational program for amateurs interested in dancing and include dance lessons with children who are elementary school students and dance beginners. The public response to E Dance Academy was great, including being actually used as a reference in school classes. For this reason it was decided to become a regular program.

In 2013, he participated in Üsa's DANCE EARTH project by being part of the coed unit Dance Earth Party as a performer.

On April 29, 2015, Tetsuya became a fixed member of Dance Earth Party alongside Üsa and Dream Shizuka. On December 28 in the same year, it was announced that he would undergo surgery on his left shoulder in early 2016 due to a joint dislocation.

On October 6, 2016, he was appointed as a "Yokosuka Excitement Ambassador" alongside Kenchi Tachibana. Both being Yokosuka locals, they remained strongly attached to their hometown even after joining Exile and continuously contribute to the development of the children of the city. In the same year, Tetsuya became a visiting associate professor at Mimasaka University to examine the impact of dance on children.

On March 26, 2018, Tetsuya graduated from Waseda University Graduate School of Sports Sciences with a master's degree after completing a one-year master's program. He published his master's thesis on the theme of "The present situation and prescription of modern rhythm dance classes at junior high schools after the mandatory education ~Class design and auxiliary video teaching materials for students who enjoy and teachers who have difficulties in teaching~". His master's thesis won the Excellent Paper Award of his university. On December 4 in the same year, all Dance Earth Party members announced the group's indefinite hiatus. Tetsuya would go on with his activities as a member of Exile and Exile The Second.

On May 13, 2019, it was revealed that he was diagnosed with bilateral patellar subluxation syndrome and would be halting his activities as performer in order to receive treatment and fully recover. On September 27 in the same year, it was announced that he would return as an instructor on E Dance Academy and thus resume his activities as a performer. On November 25, it was announced during a press conference that he was appointed as the president of "EXPG High School", a joint project between EXPG Studio and the correspondence school corporation Kadokawa Dwango Gakuen "N Prep-School" which would begin in April 2020. On December 23, Tetsuya will release his first business book titled Mitsuami Raifu (三つ編みライフ; Braid Life). The title of the book was chosen to represent his work in three completely different fields: dance, research and coffee business, combining them together in a "braid" style as his profession.

Personal life 
On March 5, 2019, it was announced via Exile related websites and news outlets that Tetsuya registered his marriage to a 37-year-old non-celebrity woman after 3 years of dating. It was also revealed the couple were expecting their first child that would be born around summer 2019. This made him the 6th married Exile member joining Hiro, Matsu, Makidai, Üsa and Takahiro and 5th to have a child. On August 20, 2019, Tetsuya revealed at the press conference for MACHI cafe's Amazing Ice Caramel Latte that his first child was born healthy and safely.

Participating groups

Filmography 

※His roles in bold are his starring works

Stage

TV dramas

Internet dramas

Films

TV programmes

Advertisements

Radio

Magazine and newspaper serializations

Others

Productions

Awards

References

External links 
 at Exile Official Website 
"Exile Tetsuya Dance no Michi" 

Japanese male dancers
Male actors from Kanagawa Prefecture
1981 births
Living people
LDH (company) artists
21st-century Japanese male actors